Mordehai Dubin (January 1, 1889, Riga, Governorate of Livonia, Russian Empire — 1956, Tula, USSR) was a major Jewish spiritual and political leader in Latvia. He served as a Member of Parliament (Saeima) for the Agudas Israel party. He headed the Jewish community in Latvia until 1940, when it was annexed by the USSR.

Due to his efforts, the imprisonment of the famous "Lubavitcher" Rebbe Yosef Yitzchok Schneersohn in the USSR in 1927 was commuted to exile in Latvia.

Dubin was a personal friend of Kārlis Ulmanis, the nationalist authoritarian dictator of Latvia from 1934 to 1940.

Dubin was deported from Latvia by the Soviet authorities in 1940 and released in 1942. After World War II he returned to Riga  where the local press attacked him violently, of course under orders from above. He was arrested again and deported in 1948. He lived under arrest and exile in Siberia, first in Samara, and later in Tula, where he died in 1956 in a labor camp and is buried.

References

1889 births
1956 deaths
Politicians from Riga
People from Kreis Riga
Latvian Jews
Chabad-Lubavitch Hasidim
Agudas Israel (Latvia) politicians
Members of the People's Council of Latvia
Deputies of the Constitutional Assembly of Latvia
Deputies of the 1st Saeima
Deputies of the 2nd Saeima
Deputies of the 3rd Saeima
Deputies of the 4th Saeima
Inmates of Vladimir Central Prison